Criminal Lovers (French title: Les Amants criminels) is a 1999 psychological thriller and horror film by French director François Ozon. In fact, it is modern retelling of Hansel and Gretel.

Plot
High school student Alice convinces her boyfriend and lover Luc to murder their classmate Saïd, with whom she was having an affair, and who, she claims, raped her. When they dispose of his body in the woods late one night, the couple get lost on their way back to their car and are taken in by a mysterious old hermit. Matters take a bizarre turn when the stranger locks the young lovers in his cellar with the dead body of Saïd and reveals that he plans to eat them. The stranger harnesses Luc and convinces him to have sex by allowing Luc and Alice to survive. After sharing the stranger's bed with him, Luc escapes from the forest without killing the hermit.

When the couple emerges from the forest, they find the police near their car. The authorities have learned of their murder of Saïd, and arrest them and the hermit, apparently after Saïd's body is found. Luc gets arrested after getting caught in a bear trap, and Alice tries to run away but is eventually caught and killed by the police. In the final sequence, Luc, in vain, tries to stop the police, who are beating the forester. In despair and anguish, Luc is carried to the city in the police car.

Cast

Reception
On review aggregator website Rotten Tomatoes, the film has a rating of 67% based on 15 critics, with an average rating of 6.1/10. On Metacritic, the film has a score of 59 out of 100 based on reviews from 13 critics, indicating "mixed or average reviews".

Neil Smith of BBC called the film "unsettling, subversive thriller that combines sadism, cannibalism, and homoeroticism to increasingly delirious effect".

Owen Gleiberman of Entertainment Weekly compared it to Deliverance and Hansel and Gretel fairy tale.

Elvis Mitchell of The New York Times had criticized the film, writing that "it never develops a life of its own" because of "[its] amalgam of fairy tales, old movies and tabloid stories".

References

External links

1990s psychological thriller films
Films directed by François Ozon
French LGBT-related films
French psychological thriller films
LGBT-related thriller films
1999 LGBT-related films
1990s French films